Queen Elizabeth Park is a regional park located on the Kapiti Coast in New Zealand. The park is managed by the Greater Wellington Regional Council and contains the last area of natural dunes on the Kapiti Coast. Facilities and attractions at the park include walkways, a restored wetland, a campground,  a visitor centre, the Wellington Tramway Museum, and an area for equestrian activities.

Geography

The park is bordered by Paekākāriki, Raumati South, two state highways ( and ), and the North Island Main Trunk Railway.

The main entrance is at Mackays Crossing; secondary entrances are in Raumati South and Paekākāriki.

History

The park is steeped in history including pā sites at Whareroa Beach and Wainui Beach. The tangata whenua of the park are Ngati Haumia, a hapu of the Ngāti Toa iwi and Te Atiawa ki Whakarongotai, who occupied the area for hundreds of years until the mid-19th century.

The number of European settlers grew during the 1830s, and European farmers started to dominate the area from the mid-1850s.

During World War II, the park was the location of two United States Army and Marines bases, Camp MacKay and Camp Russell.  U.S. troops were stationed at the camps in 1942–44 prior to being sent into combat in the Pacific Ocean theatre. Today, little evidence of the 20,000 strong military camps remains.  A group of facades represents the huts of the marines who lived in the area during World War II, and there is also a sculpture memorial to ten marines who died when a vessel sank offshore.

The park was named for Queen Elizabeth II before her coronation and was opened during the 1953 Royal Visit. Many recreation facilities were developed in the 1950s and 1960s.

The park has legal protection as a recreation reserve under the Reserves Act 1977.

Restoration of wetland

Two areas of wetland were created within the park in the 2000s near Mackay's Crossing, using excavation and plantings to restore the habitat. There is a renmant of native bush adjacent to the restored wetland.

Environmentalists wanted other farmland in the regional park to also be restored to wetland.

In December 2021,  of land previously leased for grazing stock was retired so that it could be restored.

Visitor centre 

Plans for the development of the park facilities at the Mackays Crossing entrance were announced in 2012. A visitor centre named Ramaroa was opened in 2017. The complex includes a meeting room with capacity for 60 people, a park ranger office and public toilets. The design of the Ramaroa Centre is unusual and includes a gullwing roof. The architecture takes inspiration from the history of the site, including Māori wharenui and the forms of the tents and huts used in the US Marines camp.

Recreation

Several expansive lawn areas near Whareroa Beach and the southern entrance at Paekākāriki provide plenty of space for picnics and recreational activities. Public toilets are located at the car parks at the end of the road to Whareroa Beach, and near the playground and car parks at the Paekākāriki entrance.

A coastal walkway and an inland walkway run the length of Queen Elizabeth Park from Raumati South to Paekākārikii. Near the main entrance, a loop walkway leads through a wetland area and bush remnant with mature kahikatea.

The park also includes the Wellington Tramway Museum and several campgrounds.

The park is open from 8am to dusk, year-round. Dogs are permitted, but must be kept on a leash in picnic areas and are not permitted on or near farmland. Fireworks are prohibited at all times.

References

External links

Queen Elizabeth Park at Greater Wellington

Kapiti Coast District
Regional parks of New Zealand
Parks in the Wellington Region